Golini Tomb is an Etruscan tomb in Orvieto, Italy. It was discovered in 1863.

References

Etruscan tombs
1863 in Italy
Buildings and structures in Orvieto
Archaeological sites in Umbria